Wesley Albert Ramsey (born October 6, 1977) is an American actor. He is  known for his performance in the romantic drama film Latter Days, and for playing Sam Spencer on the CBS daytime soap opera Guiding Light and for his recurring role as Wyatt Halliwell on The WB supernatural drama Charmed. He portrayed Peter August on the ABC soap opera General Hospital.

Early life
He attended the Juilliard School's drama division as a member of Group 29 (1996–2000), which also included Morena Baccarin and Glenn Howerton.

Career
Ramsey's first major acting role was playing Sam Spencer on the CBS daytime soap opera Guiding Light, a role he portrayed over the next eight years.

In 2003 Ramsey played Greg on the short-lived Fox comedy series Luis. The same year he was cast in a starring role in the independent film Latter Days. In 2011 Ramsey was cast in the main role of Max on the short-lived NBC historical drama series The Playboy Club.

Filmography

Film

Television

Theater

References

External links
 Wes Ramsey.com - Official Website
 

1977 births
Living people
Male actors from Louisville, Kentucky
American male film actors
American male television actors
Juilliard School alumni
21st-century American male actors